Parafossarulus is a genus of freshwater snails with gills and an operculum, an aquatic prosobranch gastropod mollusks in the family Bithyniidae.

Species 
Species within the genus Parafossarulus include:
 Parafossarulus anomalospiralis Liu, Li & Liu, 1985
 † Parafossarulus crassitesta (Bröhmme, 1885)
 Parafossarulus eximius (Frauenfeld)
 Parafossarulus globosus Liu, Zhang & Wang, 1994
 † Parafossarulus priscillae Girotti, 1972
 Parafossarulus manchouricus (Gerstfeldt in Bourguignat, 1860)
 Parafossarulus spiridonovi Zatrawkin & Starobogatov in Zatrawkin, Dovgalev & Starobogatov, 1989
 Parafossarulus striatulus (Benson, 1842) - type species
 Parafossarulus sungariensis Moskvicheva in Starobogatov, Zatravkin, 1987

Taxonomy 
Glöer (2002) reassigned two European extinct species of Parafossarulus into a subgenus of the genus Bithynia, but the genus Parafossarulus is generally accepted for the Asian species.

References

External links 
 

Bithyniidae